Hello Internet is an audio podcast hosted by educational YouTube content creators Brady Haran and CGP Grey. The podcast debuted in 2014 and released 136 numbered episodes and 18 unnumbered episodes until February 2020, when the last episode was published. The podcast is currently indefinitely suspended and inactive. Listeners of the podcast are known as "Tims". The episodes of the podcast are usually about the interests of the creators and the differences between the hosts' lifestyles.

Content 

The podcast features discussions pertaining to their lives as professional creators for YouTube, the content of their most recent videos as well as their interests and annoyances. Typical topics include YouTube, technology etiquette, books, movie and TV show reviews, plane accidents, vexillology, futurology, and the differences between Haran and Grey's personalities and lifestyles.

History 

The podcast debuted in January 2014. That year it reached the #1 iTunes podcast in the United Kingdom. It was also selected as one of Apple's best emerging new podcasts of 2014.

In 2015, Brady Haran was credited with re-introducing the word "freebooting" during a podcast episode (episode 5, "Freebooting", released in 2014) to describe copyright infringement via re-hosting videos on platforms such as Facebook, a practice typically undertaken to profit from advertisements alongside the content. Facebook has since adopted tools to address this.

The Guardian included the podcast among its 50 best of 2016, naming episode 66 ("A Classic Episode") its episode of the year; the paper described the podcast as having "in-depth debates and banter that is actually amusing".

Beginning with episode 123 ("Pop Quiz"), after-show episodes titled Goodbye Internet were released as companion podcasts with the main episodes, exclusive for Patreon supporters of the "Goodbye Internet" tier.

The podcast has been inactive since 28 February 2020, when episode 136 was released. On 18 May 2020, Haran said on Reddit that they were taking a break.

Episodes
 the most recent episode of Hello Internet is numbered 136. However, there are only 133 normal numbered episodes of Hello Internet as the numbering sometimes, although inconsistently, skips a number to accommodate the inclusion of one or more special unnumbered episodes, of which there are 18. These specials include one bonus episode, three Christmas specials discussing Star Wars movies, twelve episodes released during the end of 2018 as the "12 Days of Christmas," and two episodes that were not released digitally. The two non-digitally released episodes are available exclusively on physical media, the first on a vinyl record and the second on a wax cylinder.

The first 10 episodes (1–10) of Hello Internet were referred to as season 1, and the second 10 episodes (11–20) were referred to as season 2. Episode 21 was referred to as the first episode of season 3, and at the beginning of Episode 29, Episode 30 was referred to as the season finale of season 3 and Episode 31 was referred to as being in the 4th season, but the topic of seasonation was not discussed again after this until one hour into Episode 115.

See also
 Cortex
 The Unmade Podcast
 The Numberphile Podcast

References

External links 

2014 podcast debuts
Audio podcasts
Comedy and humor podcasts
Podcasts with educational YouTubers